Synuchus himalayicus is a species of ground beetle in the subfamily Harpalinae. It was described by Arnošt Jedlička in 1935.

References

Synuchus
Beetles described in 1935